Annefield may refer to:

Annefield (Saxe, Virginia)
Annefield (Boyce, Virginia)